Asha Digamber Singh (1 August 1955 – 30 August 2021) was a Bhartiya Janata Party leader and businesswoman. She was the wife of Former Minister Digamber Singh. She led the Shri Digamber Group of Hospitals and Institutions.

Career
Singh was the Chairman & Founder of Shri. Digamber Group of Hospitals and Medical Institutions which is a prominent group in Rajasthan.

Singh's husband Digamber Singh was MLA for over two decades and served as a Cabinet Minister in the Government of Rajasthan. She was seen as a potential candidate for various designations in the BJP organisation. Her name was also circulated during the 2008 & 2013 Rajasthan elections from the constituency of Nadbai, Bharatpur. Following the death of her husband in 2017, she considered running to succeed him from Deeg-Kumher Assembly constituency, Bharatpur. However, her son Shailesh contested the election.

References

People from Bharatpur district
Bharatiya Janata Party politicians from Rajasthan
20th-century Indian businesswomen
20th-century Indian businesspeople
21st-century Indian businesswomen
21st-century Indian businesspeople
Businesswomen from Uttar Pradesh
1955 births
2021 deaths